Littlefield Unified School District is a PK-12 grade school district headquartered in Beaver Dam, Arizona.

Littlefield Unified's District covers a large geographical area in Mohave County, located in the extreme northwest corner of the state. The school district serves the unincorporated towns of Beaver Dam, Littlefield, Desert Springs and Scenic, Arizona, including Arvada and Fairview. It has a population of roughly 340 students throughout elementary, junior high and high school. Mount Trumbull and the re-built schoolhouse are part of the school district.

History
The history of Littlefield School District #9 dates back to the early 1900s when a few families in the farming communities of Littlefield and Beaver Dam were holding school in their homes. An adobe building was constructed several hundred feet above the Virgin River in Littlefield and formal education commenced there sometime around 1910.

The 1926-1927 school year exhibited a tremendous group of students attending at the one room school in Littlefield. The attendance/grade book is dominated by a few family names: McKnight, Leavitt, Peterson and Reber. The average daily attendance was 13 students.

Not much changed for the next 60 years within the district.

There were years during the late 1970s and early 1980s where only one or two students were enrolled at the school. Growth began to occur in the district during the later part of the 1980s. The one-room school house soon had several modular buildings dotting the perimeter of the property. By 1992 enrollment at the school approached 100 students.

Throughout the 20th century, all students attending the Littlefield School were taught up until 5th or 8th grade. Students then proceeded to Virgin Valley High School in Mesquite, Nevada, where they were able to participate in programs and graduate from an accredited institution. A Certificate of Educational Convenience (CEC) was approved by the County Superintendent authorizing the district to use Arizona funds for tuition of students attending Virgin Valley High School. In the 1991-92 school year, Littlefield Middle School was established, and students in grades 6-8 no longer traveled to Mesquite for further education.

With enrollment steadily climbing, the governing board of the district enlisted the assistance of the newly established Arizona School Facilities Board to assist in the construction of a new school across the Interstate 15 freeway, and in 1997, then-Arizona governor Fife Symington arrived at the Littlefield School with a $3 million check to the district. In 1999, Beaver Dam Elementary opened and a new era began. The Littlefield site was abandoned as students in grades K-8 moved into the new building. It was temporarily used again in the 2000-2001 school year due to increased elementary enrollment, and students were bussed to the newer school for lunch.

Unprecedented student and community growth continued, prompting discussion among the board regarding the prospect of a new high school in Beaver Dam. It was soon determined to build the school, slated for opening in 2003. Students who would be graduating from Beaver Dam High School in 2006 remained at the elementary school their freshman year and all subsequent students would also attend the entirety of their elementary and secondary education within the district.

In 2002, an eight classroom addition was added to the Beaver Dam Elementary School to accommodate continued growth in addition to providing space for the additional secondary students. Two modular buildings were brought from the Littlefield site to Beaver Dam where they were remodeled. This provided four additional classrooms to be utilized by the middle school and high school students.

Beaver Dam High School opened its doors in the fall of 2004. Two additional modular buildings were added to the middle school campus over the next few years in addition to a sport court and locker room facility.

An additional wing was constructed at the high school in 2008 and includes a media center, commons area, and six classrooms. A capital improvement bond was passed by the community shortly thereafter, facilitating the construction of vocational facility, stage, and visiting team locker rooms. Athletic fields and landscaping were also completed at this time.

Today the district serves approximately 340 students residing in Littlefield, Beaver Dam, Desert Springs, Arvada and Scenic. The elementary school and junior/senior high school are all located within walking distance of each other in Beaver Dam.

Since July 2018, Mrs. Darlene McCauley has served as the District Superintendent and Principal of Beaver Dam Jr./Sr. High School. Mr. Jeremy Clarke is the Principal at Beaver Dam Elementary, joining in Summer 2020.

Governing Board of Education

Past Board Presidents
 Rená Moerman
 Darrell Garlick
 Christa Biasi
 Alyson Hughes
 Tammy Giebink
 Tom Stoddard
 Eva Jensen
 Lyle Jones
 Christine Reber

Past Superintendents

Past Principals

Before 1989, Littlefield had "head teachers." Brooks Norton became the first official school Principal

Past Governing Board of Education Members
Mrs. Rena Moerman (third service 2017-2022)
Mrs. Blanca Beltran
Mrs. Edwina Jauregui
Mr. Darrin Jones
Mr. Sonny Graham (first service 2013-2016)
Mrs. Rena Moerman (second service 2010-2016)
Mrs. Carmen Plancarte
Mr. Darrell Garlick
Mrs. Sherrie Daniels
Mrs. Christa Biasi
Mrs. Shannon Hartley
Dr. Jose L. Trujillo
Mrs. Alyson Hughes
Mrs. Tammy Giebink
Mrs. Cheryl Graham
Mr. Tom Stoddard
Mr. Dan Powell
Mrs. Rena Moerman (first service 1996-2002)
Mrs. LaRene Layton
Mr. Ron Petersen (passed away while serving & shortly after re-election in 2000; did not serve 3rd term)
Mrs. Thelma Davis
Mrs. Eva Jensen
Ms. Roxanne Pudney
Mrs. Lorraine Hammond
Mrs. Linda Peterson
Mr. Lyle Jones
Mrs. Amber Davis
Mrs. Christine Reber
Mrs. Lorna Reber

Schools
 Beaver Dam Elementary
 Beaver Dam Jr./Sr. High School

Littlefield School

Littlefield School was a school that served grades Kindergarten through Eighth in nearby Littlefield. The property is part of the Littlefield Unified School District.

The history of Littlefield School dates back to 1894 when a few families in the farming communities of Littlefield and Beaver Dam held school in a two-room rock house down by the Virgin River. In 1910, a wood building (23 ft by 40 ft) was built by some of the early settlers in the second bench. This was for students to attend school, residents and students to attend church services and social activities. The building was later purchased and made into a home around 1925.

An adobe building was constructed in 1924 several hundred feet above the Virgin River in Littlefield. The building had its first meeting on November 2, 1924, with students attending classes after that. Records show the building cost about $5,000 to construct. In 1936, the property was sold to the Mohave County School District for $100.

Education in Littlefield was held from 1894 until 1999.. Brooks Norton became the School's first official principal in 1989. Beginning in 1990, portable modular buildings were installed on campus to house offices and classrooms with student enrollment increasing. This also included a cafeteria building. Previously, Littlefield School had no lunch program and lunch was packed and sent to school by parents/guardians. On April 1, 1997, then Arizona Governor Fife Symington visited Littlefield School to present a ceremonial check for $3 Million to build a new state-of-the-art school in Beaver Dam. This was the second visit by an Arizona Governor to the area in 70 years.

See also
 List of school districts in Arizona

External links
Littlefield Unified School District

School districts in Mohave County, Arizona
1910 establishments in Arizona Territory
School districts established in 1910